Gaston Maurice Julia (3 February 1893 – 19 March 1978) was a French Algerian mathematician who devised the formula for the Julia set. His works were popularized by French mathematician Benoit Mandelbrot; the Julia and Mandelbrot fractals are closely related. He founded, independently with Pierre Fatou, the modern theory of holomorphic dynamics.

Military service
Julia was born in the Algerian town of Sidi Bel Abbes, at the time governed by the French. During his youth, he had an interest in mathematics and music. His studies were interrupted at the age of 21, when France became involved in World War I and Julia was conscripted to serve with the army. During an attack he suffered a severe injury, losing his nose. His many operations to remedy the situation were all unsuccessful, and for the rest of his life he resigned himself to wearing a leather strap around the area where his nose had been.

Career in mathematics
Julia gained attention for his mathematical work at the age of 25, in 1918, when his 199-page Mémoire sur l'itération des fonctions rationnelles ("Memoir on the Iteration of Rational Functions") was featured in the Journal de Mathématiques Pures et Appliquées. This article gained immense popularity among mathematicians and earned him the Grand Prix des Sciences Mathématiques of the French Academy of Sciences in 1918. But after this brief moment of fame, his works were mostly forgotten until the day Benoit Mandelbrot mentioned them in his works on fractals.

On 19 March 1978, Julia died in Paris at the age of 85.

Julia was also father to Marc Julia, the French organic chemist who invented the Julia olefination.

World War Two and collaboration

Julia had collaborated with the Nazi Germany during the occupation of France. He searched and found French mathematicians to collaborate with the Zentralblatt für Mathematik, and was suspended for a few weeks after the liberation of France. But according to Michèle Audin:

Books
Oeuvres, 6 vols., Paris, Gauthier-Villars 1968-1970 (eds. Jacques Dixmier, Michel Hervé, with foreword by Julia)
Leçons sur les Fonctions Uniformes à Point Singulier Essentiel Isolé, Gauthier-Villars 1924 (rédigées par P. Flamant)
Eléments de géométrie infinitésimale, Gauthier-Villars 1927
Cours de Cinématique, Gauthier-Villars 1928, 2nd edition 1936
Exercices d'Analyse, 4 vols., Gauthier-Villars, 1928–1938, 2nd edition 1944, 1950
Principes Géométriques d'Analyse, 2 vols., Gauthier-Villars, 1930, 1932
Essai sur le Développement de la Théorie des Fonctions de Variables Complexes, Gauthier-Villars 1933
Introduction Mathématique aux Theories Quantiques, 2 vols., Gauthier-Villars 1936, 1938, 2nd edition 1949, 1955
Eléments d'algèbre, Gauthier-Villars 1959
Cours de Géométrie, Gauthier-Villars 1941
Cours de géométrie infinitésimale, Gauthier-Villars, 2nd edition 1953
Exercices de géométrie, 2 vols., Gauthier-Villars 1944, 1952
Leçons sur la représentation conforme des aires simplement connexes, Gauthier-Villars 1931, 2nd edition 1950
Leçons sur la représentation conforme des aires multiplement connexes, Gauthier-Villars 1934
Traité de Théorie de Fonctions, Gauthier-Villars 1953
Leçons sur les fonctions monogènes uniformes d'une variable complexe, Gauthier-Villars 1917
Étude sur les formes binaires non quadratiques à indéterminées réelles ou complexes, ou à indéterminées conjuguées, Gauthier-Villars 1917

See also
Mandelbrot set

References

External links
 
 
 Memoir on iteration of rational functions, English translation in parts: 1/7,2/7, 3/7,4/7,5/7,6/7,7/7.
 Downloadable articles at Numdam.
 Christoph Dötsch, Dynamik meromorpher Funktionen auf der Riemannschen Zahlenkugel, Diplomica GmbH Hamburg (2008)
 Daniel Alexander, Felice Iavernaro, Alessandro Rosa: Early days in complex dynamics: a history of complex dynamics in one variable during 1906-1942, History of Mathematics 38, American Mathematical Society 2012

1893 births
1978 deaths
École Normale Supérieure alumni
20th-century French mathematicians
University of Paris alumni
Academic staff of the University of Paris
Members of the French Academy of Sciences
People from Sidi Bel Abbès
French military personnel of World War I
Pieds-Noirs
Migrants from French Algeria to France